Michael Murray (born March 19, 1943 in Kokomo, Indiana) is an American-born organist and writer.

Biography 

Murray studied at Butler University and the Oberlin College Conservatory of Music, before private study with Marcel Dupré in Paris. (He was the last important student of Dupré, of whom he would later write a biography.) During the 1968–69 performance season, Murray performed the complete organ works of Johann Sebastian Bach in a series of twelve recitals in Cleveland.  He later commemorated the 150th birthday of César Franck by playing that composer's complete organ works in 1972. He repeated the cycle for the hundredth anniversary of Franck's death (1990, at the Cathedral of St. John the Divine in New York City.) Murray's performances have included nearly every major city in North America, with numerous appearances as a soloist with major orchestras.  Critics hailed Murray's rare combination of technique, thoughtfulness, and musical feeling. He has made many recordings on the Telarc label,  featuring the works of Bach, Franck, Camille Saint-Saëns and others.

Murray is now retired from concert performing and recording. He also retired in June, 2014, from St. Mark's Episcopal Church in Columbus, Ohio, where he was organist for 31 years. He was named organist emeritus. He is also a librarian in the Music and Dance Library at The Ohio State University.

Murray has written many articles and has published five books.  His Marcel Dupré:  The Work of a Master Organist (Northeastern University Press) is in its third printing.  He has also written French Masters of the Organ (Yale University Press) and served as editor for A Jacques Barzun Reader (HarperCollins).  He has written a biography of Jacques Barzun, Jacques Barzun: Portrait of a Mind (Frederic C. Beil).

Murray has been awarded an honorary doctorate by Ohio State University (2000).

Discography
Bach at The Methuen Memorial Music Hall
Bach at The First Congregational Church, Los Angeles
A Recital of Works by Bach, Messiaen, Dupre, Widor & Franck
Bach: The Organ At St. Andreas-Kirche, Hildesheim
An Organ Blaster Sampler: The Best of Michael Murray
Bach and Franck
Bach at St. Bavo's: Concert from St. Bavo's Church, The Netherlands
Bach at Zwolle
Bach in Los Angeles (Toccata & Fugue in D minor)
Bach Organ Blaster
Bach: Organ Works
Bach: The Organs at First Congregational Church, Los Angeles
Ceremonial Music for Trumpet & Organ (with Rolf Smedvig)
Dupre, Franck & Widor
Dupre: Symphony in G minor & Rheinberger: Organ Concerto No. 1 (with the Royal Philharmonic Orchestra)
Encores a la francaise & Poulenc: Organ Concerto (with the Atlanta Symphony Orchestra)
Franck: The Complete Masterworks for Organ
Jongen: Symphonie Concertante & Franck: Fantaisie in A (with the San Francisco Symphony)
Music for Organ, Brass & Percussion (with the Empire Brass)
Poulenc: Gloria and Concerto for Organ (with the Atlanta Symphony Orchestra)
Saint-Saëns: Symphony No. 3 and Encores a la francaise
Saint-Saëns: Symphony No. 3 (with the Philadelphia Orchestra)
Saint-Saëns: Symphony No. 3 in C minor, Organ (with the Royal Philharmonic Orchestra)
The Willis Organ at Salisbury Cathedral
The Young Bach
Vierne: Organ Symphonies
Works by Franck, Widor, Dupre, Bach & others

Bibliography
1985 Marcel Dupré: The Work Of A Master Organist. Northeastern, 
1994 Albert Schweitzer, Musician. Scolar, 
1998 French Masters of the Organ. Yale, 
2003 Editor, A Jacques Barzun Reader: Selections from His Works. Harper, 
2011 Jacques Barzun: Portrait of a Mind. Frederic C. Beil,

References

External links

Saint Mark's Episcopal Church, Columbus Website

Living people
American classical organists
American male organists
Oberlin College alumni
Butler University alumni
1943 births
21st-century organists
21st-century American male musicians
21st-century American keyboardists
Male classical organists